Stanzach is a municipality in the Reutte district in the Austrian state of Tyrol.

Geography
Stanzach lies at the entrance to the Namlos valley in the Lech valley.

References

Cities and towns in Reutte District